Losi may refer to:

 Losi (mythology), a Polynesian mythological figure
 Losi Harford (born 1973), New Zealand cricketer
 Team Losi, a manufacturer of radio controlled models
 Giacomo Losi (born 1935), Italian football defender

See also
 Łosie (disambiguation)